Rochelle is an unincorporated community in McCulloch County, Texas, United States. According to the Handbook of Texas, the community had an estimated population of 163 in 2000.

Geography
Rochelle is located at  (31.2246097, -99.2111613). It is situated along U.S. Highway 190 in east central McCulloch County, approximately ten miles northeast of Brady.

Climate
The climate in this area is characterized by hot, humid summers and generally mild to cool winters.  According to the Köppen Climate Classification system, Rochelle has a humid subtropical climate, abbreviated "Cfa" on climate maps.

History
Initial names for the community included Crewville and Crothers, both in honor of early McCulloch County residents. When a post office was established in 1879, the name Rochelle was suggested by a local settler from La Rochelle, France, which was accepted by postal officials. A one-room schoolhouse was first built in 1886 when the community had a population of approximately 30. The Fort Worth and Rio Grande Railway Company laid its track from Brownwood to Brady in 1903. A second line, the Gulf, Colorado and Santa Fe Railroad completed its track from Eden to Lometa in 1912. The arrival of the railroads caused Rochelle to grow substantially. The number of inhabitants had risen to around 700 by 1914. In 1930, several smaller schools consolidated with Rochelle High School. These  schools were Placid, Claxton, Corn Creek, and Round Mountain. Several more schools, including Cowboy, Fairview, East Sweden, and Mercury had transferred their students to Rochelle by the end of 1937. Rochelle's population during the 1930s was just over 500 and remained at that level until the 1950s. The Gulf, Colorado and Santa Fe Railway abandoned its track through the community in 1959, accelerating the rate of decline. By the early 1960s, only 100 people remained in Rochelle. That figure rose slightly to 163 in the 1960s and remained at that level through 2000.

Although Rochelle is unincorporated, it has a post office, with the ZIP code of 76872.

Education
Public education in the community of Rochelle is provided by the Rochelle Independent School District and home to the Rochelle High School Hornets.  The district covers a large portion of northeastern McCulloch County.

Notable residents
 Bonnie Richardson - won the Class 1A high school team track and field state championship singlehandedly in 2008 and 2009.

References

External links

Unincorporated communities in McCulloch County, Texas
Unincorporated communities in Texas